Mirkovice is a municipality and village in Český Krumlov District in the South Bohemian Region of the Czech Republic. It has about 500 inhabitants. The village centre is well preserved and is protected by law as a village monument zone.

Administrative parts
Villages and hamlets of Chabičovice, Malčice, Svachova Lhotka, Zahrádka and Žaltice are administrative parts of Mirkovice.

References

Villages in Český Krumlov District